The Quapaw (or Arkansas and Ugahxpa) people are a tribe of Native Americans that coalesced in what is known as the Midwest and Ohio Valley of the present-day United States. The Dhegiha Siouan-speaking tribe historically migrated from the Ohio Valley area to the west side of the Mississippi River in what is now the state of Arkansas; their name for themselves (or autonym) refers to this migration and to traveling downriver.

The Quapaw are federally recognized as the Quapaw Nation. The U.S. federal government forcibly removed them to Indian Territory in 1834, and their tribal base has been in present-day Ottawa County in northeastern Oklahoma. The number of members enrolled in the tribe was 3,240 in 2011.

Name
Algonquian-speaking people called the Quapaw akansa. French explorers and colonists learned this term from Algonquians and adapted it in French as Arcansas. The French named the Arkansas River and the territory of Arkansas for them.

Government

The Quapaw Nation is headquartered in Quapaw in Ottawa County, Oklahoma, in the northeast corner of the state. They have a  Quapaw tribal jurisdictional area.

The Quapaw people elect a tribal council and the tribal chairman, who serves a two-year term. The governing body of the tribe is outlined in the governing resolutions of the tribe, which were voted upon and approved in 1956 to create a written form of government. (Prior to 1956 the Quapaw Tribe operated on a traditional, hereditary chief system). The Chairman is Joseph T. Byrd. Of the 3,240 enrolled tribal members, 892 live in the state of Oklahoma. Membership in the tribe is based on lineal descent.

The tribe operates a Tribal Police Department and a Fire Department, which handles both fire and EMS calls. They issue their own tribal vehicle tags and have their own housing authority.

Economic development
The tribe owns two smoke shops and motor fuel outlets, known as the Quapaw C-Store and Downstream Q-Store. They also own and operate the Eagle Creek Golf Course and resort, located in Loma Linda, Missouri. 

Their primary economic drivers have been their gaming casinos, established under federal and state law. The first two are both located in Quapaw: the Quapaw Casino and the Downstream Casino Resort. These have generated most of the revenue for the tribe, which they have used to support welfare, health and education of their members. In 2012 the Quapaw Tribe's annual economic impact in the region was measured at more than $225,000,000.

In 2020 they completed a third casino, Saracen Casino Resort, located in Pine Bluff, Arkansas. It was the first purpose-built casino in the state. Constructed at a cost of $350 million, it will employ over 1,100 full-time staff.

In the 20th century, the Quapaw leased some of their lands to European Americans, who developed them for industrial purposes. Before passage of environmental laws, toxic waste was deposited that has created long-term hazards. For instance, the Tar Creek Superfund site has been listed by the Environmental Protection Agency as requiring clean-up of environmental hazards.

Language

The traditional Quapaw language is part of the Dhegiha branch of the Siouan language family. Quapaw was well documented in fieldnotes and publications from many individuals, including George Izard in 1827, Lewis F. Hadley in 1882, 19th-century linguist James Owen Dorsey, Frank T. Siebert in 1940, and linguist Robert Rankin in the 1970s. In the 21st century, there are few remaining native speakers.

To revive the language, the tribe is conducting classes in Quapaw at the tribal museum. An online audio lexicon of the Quapaw language was created by editing old recordings of Elders speaking the language.

Other efforts at language preservation and revitalization are being undertaken. In 2011 the Quapaw participated in the first annual Dhegiha Gathering. The Osage language program hosted and organized the gathering, held at the Quapaw tribe's Downstream Casino. Language-learning techniques and other issues were discussed and taught in workshops at the conference among the five cognate tribes. The 2012 Annual Dhegiha Gathering was also held at Downstream Casino.

Cultural heritage
The Quapaw host cultural events throughout the year, which are primarily held at the tribal museum. These include Indian dice games, traditional singing, and classes in traditional arts, such as finger weaving, shawl making, and flute making. In addition, Quapaw language classes are held there.

Fourth of July
The tribe's annual dance is during the weekend of the Fourth of July. This dance was organized  shortly after the American Civil War, 2011 was the 139th anniversary of this dance. Common features of this powwow include gourd dance, war dance, stomp dance, and 49s. Other activities take place such as Indian football, handgame, traditional footraces, traditional dinners, turkey dance, and other dances such as Quapaw Dance, and dances from other area tribes.

This weekend is also when the tribe convenes the annual general council meeting, during which important decisions regarding the policies and resolutions of the Quapaw tribe are voted upon by tribal members over the age of eighteen.

History
The modern descendants of this language group include the Omaha, Ponca, Osage and Kaw, all independent nations. The Quapaw and the other Dhegiha Siouan speaking tribes are believed to have migrated west and south from the Ohio River valley after 1200 CE.

Scholars are divided as to whether they think the Quapaw and other related groups left before or after the Beaver Wars of the 17th century, in which the more powerful Five Nations of the Iroquois (based south of the Great Lakes and to the east of this area), drove other tribes out of the Ohio Valley and retained the area for hunting grounds.

The Quapaw reached their historical territory, the area of the confluence of the Arkansas and Mississippi rivers, at least by the mid-17th century. The timing of the Quapaw migration into their ancestral territory in the historical period has been the subject of considerable debate by scholars of various fields. It is referred to as the "Quapaw Paradox" by academics. Many professional archaeologists have introduced numerous migration scenarios and time frames, but none has conclusive evidence. Glottochronological studies suggest the Quapaw separated from the other Dhegihan-speaking peoples in a period ranging between AD 950 to as late as AD 1513.

As French explorers Jacques Marquette and Louis Jolliet encountered and interacted with the Illinois before they did the Quapaw, they adopted this exonym for the more westerly people. In their language, they referred to them as Arcansas. English-speaking settlers who arrived later in the region adopted the name used by the French, and adapted it to English spelling conventions.

During years of colonial rule of New France, many of the ethnic French fur traders and voyageurs had an amicable relationship with the Quapaw, as they did with many other trading tribes. Many Quapaw women and French men married and had families together. Pine Bluff, Arkansas, was founded by Joseph Bonne, a man of Quapaw-French ancestry.

Écore Fabre (Fabre's Bluff) was started as a trading post by the Frenchman Fabre and was one of the first European settlements in south-central Arkansas. While the area was nominally ruled by the Spanish from 1763–1789, following French defeat in the Seven Years' War, they did not have many colonists in the area and did not interfere with the French. The United States acquired the Louisiana Purchase in 1803, which stimulated migration of English-speaking settlers to this area. They renamed Écore Fabre as Camden.

English speakers typically transliterated French names to English phonetics:  (French for "covered way or road") was gradually converted to "Smackover" by Anglo-Americans. They used this name for a local creek. , founded by the French, was translated by English speakers and renamed as Little Rock by Americans after the Louisiana Purchase.

Numerous spelling variations have been recorded in accounts of tribal names, reflecting both loose spelling traditions, and the effects of transliteration of names into the variety of European languages used in the area. Some sources listed Ouachita as a Choctaw word, whereas others list it as a Quapaw word. Either way, the spelling reflects transliteration into French.

The following passages are taken from the public domain Catholic Encyclopedia, written early in the 20th century. It describes the Quapaw from the non-native perspective of that time. Some of the tribe has strong Cherokee kin relationships then and now.

A tribe now nearly extinct, but formerly one of the most important of the lower Mississippi region, occupying several villages about the mouth of the Arkansas, chiefly on the west (Arkansas) side, with one or two at various periods on the east (Mississippi) side of the Mississippi, and claiming the whole of the Arkansas River region up to the border of the territory held by the Osage in the north-western part of the state. They are of Siouan linguistic stock, speaking the same language, spoken also with dialectic variants, by the Osage and Kansa (Kaw) in the south and by the Omaha and Ponca in Nebraska. Their name properly is Ugakhpa, which signifies "down-stream people", as distinguished from Umahan or Omaha, "up-stream people". To the Illinois and other Algonquian tribes, they were known as 'Akansea', whence their French names of Akensas and Akansas. According to concurrent tradition of the cognate tribes, the Quapaw and their kinsmen originally lived far east, possibly beyond the Alleghenies, and, pushing gradually westward, descended the Ohio River – hence called by the Illinois the "river of the Akansea" – to its junction with the Mississippi, whence the Quapaw, then including the Osage and Kansa, descended to the mouth of the Arkansas, while the Omaha, with the Ponca, went up the Missouri.

Early European contact
In 1541, when the Spanish explorer Hernando de Soto led an expedition that came across the town of Pacaha (also recorded by Garcilaso as Capaha), between the Mississippi River and a lake on the Arkansas side, apparently in present-day Phillips County. His party described the village as strongly palisaded and nearly surrounded by a ditch. Archaeological remains and local conditions bear out the description. If the migration from the Ohio Valley preceded the entrada, these people may have been the proto-Quapaw. But the expedition's chronicler recorded that the Tunica language was used in Pacaha and there is evidence for a later Quapaw migration to Arkansas. It is likely that de Soto and his expedition met Tunica there.

The first certain encounters with Quapaw by Europeans occurred more than 130 years later. In 1673, the Jesuit Father Jacques Marquette accompanied the French commander Louis Jolliet in traveling down the Mississippi by canoe. He reportedly went to the villages of the Akansea, who gave him warm welcome and listened with attention to his sermons, while he stayed with them a few days. In 1682, La Salle passed by their villages, then five in number, including one on the east bank of the Mississippi. Zenobius Membré, a Recollect father who accompanied the LaSalle expedition, planted a cross and attempted to convert the Native Americans to Christianity.

La Salle negotiated a peace with the tribe and formally "claimed" the territory for France. The Quapaw were recorded as uniformly kind and friendly toward the French. While villages relocated in the area, four Quapaw villages were generally reported by Europeans along the Mississippi River in this early period. The French transliterations were: Kappa, Ossoteoue, Touriman, and Tonginga.

Kappa was reported to have been on the eastern bank of the Mississippi River, and the other three located on the western bank in or near present-day Desha County, Arkansas. In 1721, depopulation led to the consolidation of Tourima and Tongigua into one village. Ossoteoue or Osotouy was situated at the mouth of the Arkansas River. It is now thought to correspond to an archaeological site known as the Menard-Hodges Mounds.

In 1686, the French commander Henri de Tonti built a post near the mouth of the Arkansas River, which was later known as the Arkansas Post. This began European occupation of the Quapaw country. Tonti arranged for a resident Jesuit missionary to be assigned there, but apparently without result. About 1697, a smallpox epidemic killed the greater part of the women and children of two villages. In 1727, the Jesuits, from their house in New Orleans, again took up the missionary work. In 1729, the Quapaw allied with French colonists against the Natchez, resulting in the practical extermination of the Natchez tribe.

The French relocated the Arkansas Post upriver, trying to avoid flooding. After France lwas defeated by the British in the Seven Years' War, it ceded its North American territories to Britain. This nation exchanged some territory with Spain, which took over "control" of Arkansas and other former French territory west of the Mississippi River. The Spanish built new forts to protect its valued trading post with the Quapaw.

19th century

In exchange for the territory, the U.S. pledged $4,000 ($ in today's dollars) and an annual payment of $1,000 ($ in today's dollars). A transcription error in Congress later removed most of Grant County, Arkansas and part of Saline County, Arkansas from the Quapaw claim.

Under continued U.S. pressure, in 1824 they ceded this also, excepting  occupied by the chief Saracen below Pine Bluff. They expected to incorporate with the Caddo of Louisiana, but were refused permission by the United States. Successive floods in the Caddo country near the Red River pushed many of the tribe toward starvation, and they wandered back to their old homes.

In 1834, under another treaty and the federal policy of Indian Removal, the Quapaw were removed from the Mississippi valley areas to their present location in the northeast corner of Oklahoma, then Indian Territory.

Sarrasin (alternate spelling Saracen), their last chief before the removal, was a Roman Catholic and friend of the Lazarist missionaries (Congregation of the Missions), who had arrived in 1818. He died about 1830 and is buried adjoining St. Joseph's Church, Pine Bluff. A  a memorial window in the church preserves his name. Fr. John M. Odin was the pioneer Lazarist missionary among the Quapaw; he later served as the Catholic Archbishop of New Orleans.

In 1824, the Jesuits of Maryland, under Father Charles Van Quickenborne, took up work among the native and migrant tribes of Indian Territory (present-day Kansas and Oklahoma). In 1846, the Mission of St. Francis was established among the Osage, on Neosho River, by Fathers John Shoenmakers and John Bax. They extended their services to the Quapaw for some years.

The Quapaw, together with associated remnant tribes, the Miami, Seneca, Wyandot and Ottawa, were served from the Mission of "Saint Mary of the Quapaws", at Quapaw, Oklahoma. Historians estimated their number at European encounter as 5000. The Catholic Encyclopedia noted the people had suffered from high fatalities due to epidemics, wars, removals, and social disruption. It documented their numbers as 3200 in 1687, 1600 in 1750, 476 in 1843, and 307 in 1910, including people of mixed-race. The tribes had matrilineal kinship systems, and children born to and raised by Quapaw women were considered to be tribal members.

Kinship, religion and culture
In addition to the four established divisions already noted, the Quapaw have the clan system, with a number of gentes. Polygamy was practiced by elite men, but was not common. They were agricultural. Their towns were palisaded. Their town houses, or public structures, are referred to as longhouses. They are constructed with timbers dovetailed together and bark roofs, and were commonly erected upon large man-made mounds to raise them above the frequent flooding in the lowlands along the rivers. Their ordinary houses were rectangular and long enough to accommodate several families.

The Quapaw dug large ditches, and constructed fish weirs to manage their food supply. They excelled in pottery and in the painting of hide for bed covers and other purposes. The buried their dead in the ground, sometimes in earth mounds or in the clay floors of their houses. The dead were frequently strapped to a stake in a sitting position and then covered with earth.

The Quapaw were friendly to the Europeans. They warred and competed with the Chickasaw and other Southeastern tribes over resources and trade.

20th century

In the early 20th century, an account noted that the Dhegiha language, a branch of Siouan including the "dialects" of the Omaha, Ponca, Osage, Kansa, and Quapaw, has received more extended study. Rev. J.O. Dorsey published material about it under the auspices of the Bureau of American Ethnology, now part of the Smithsonian Institution.

In popular culture
 The 2009 documentary Tar Creek, about the Tar Creek Superfund Site located on Quapaw tribal lands, explored what at one time was considered to be the worst environmental disaster in the country. The film discusses the alleged racism of environmental and governmental practices that led to the neglect and lack of regulation that produced the hazards of this site. It is credited with causing the lead poisoning of a high percentage of children.
 In 2018, Infinite Productions produced a documentary titled The Pride of the Ogahpah, about the development of the Downstream Casino Resort, which is operated by The Quapaw Nation.
 The USS Quapaw (ATF-110), a fleet ocean tug commissioned 6 May 1944, was named for the Quapaw people.

Notable Quapaw
 Louis Ballard, (1931–2007) composer, artist, and educator
 Victor Griffin ( 1873–1958), chief, interpreter, and peyote roadman
 Barbara Kyser-Collier, tribal governmental figure
 Ardina Moore, language teacher, regalia maker/textile artist
 Saracen, last traditional chief and recipient of a presidential medal
 Tall Chief ( 1840–1918), chief, peyote roadman

See also
 Quapaw Indian Agency
 List of sites and peoples visited by the Hernando de Soto Expedition
 Mitchigamea

Notes

External links

 Quapaw Tribe, official website
 Quapaw Tribal Ancestry, official tribal sanctioned site with genealogy information, pictures, and stories
 Quapaw Language, official tribal sanctioned site with language information, words, audio clips, and source information
 Quapaw, Oklahoma Historical Society's Encyclopedia of Oklahoma History and Culture
 The Quapaw Tribe of Oklahoma and The Tar Creek Project, EPA
 Quapaw Indian Tribe History, Access Genealogy
 Tar Creek, Tar Creek documentary website

 
Dhegiha Siouan peoples
Federally recognized tribes in the United States
American Indian reservations in Oklahoma
Native American tribes in Arkansas
Native American tribes in Oklahoma